Meredead is the fourth studio album by the German/Norwegian symphonic metal band Leaves' Eyes. It was released on 22 April 2011 on Napalm Records. The Deluxe Edition of the album contains a bonus DVD with five songs from a live performance recorded at the Metal Female Voices Fest, in Wieze, Belgium, on 24 October 2010.

Title
The title is inspired by the Old English compound noun meredēað, literally "sea-death", which is attested (in the genitive plural meredēaða) in the passage rodor swipode meredēaða mǣst, literally: "the greatest quantity of sea-deaths scourged the skies", in Exodus, the second poem of the Junius manuscript, in the section telling the story of the Crossing of the Red Sea. Alternatively, meredēað could be translated as "sea of death" or "deadly sea" in view of a later passage in the same text: meredēað geswealh, literally "sea-death swallowed". On her website, Liv Kristine explicitly recommends Marsden 2004, and quotes the explanation for meredēað given in the book, saying that Meredead could be translated as "dead by the sea".

Track lists

Personnel

Leaves' Eyes
Liv Kristine Espenæs – lead and backing vocals
Alexander Krull – harsh vocals, keyboards, programming, samples
Thorsten Bauer – guitars, bass, mandolin on tracks 1, 5 and 12
Sander van der Meer - guitars
Roland Navratil - drums, percussions

Additional musicians
Lingua Mortis Orchestra from Minsk, Belarus, directed by Victor Smolski
Al dente Choir from Kleinbottwar, Germany, directed by Veronika Messmer
Anette Guldbrandsen - backing vocals, lead vocals on tracks 4, 8, 10, 11
Carmen Elise Espenæs - lead and backing vocals on track 7
Maite Itoiz - lead and backing vocals on tracks 2 and 6, baroque guitar on track 12
John Kelly - lead vocals on track 12
Christian Roch - Uilleann pipes and whistles
Janna Kirchhof - fiddle on tracks 2, 3 and 11, nyckelharpa on track 4

Production
Alexander Krull - producer, engineer, mixing and mastering at Mastersound Studios
Thorsten Bauer, Liv Kristine Espenæs - assistant engineers
Victor Smolski - orchestra recording engineer
Orchestral arrangements by Leaves' Eyes

Charts

References

2011 albums
Leaves' Eyes albums
Napalm Records albums
Albums produced by Alexander Krull